The Chibougamau River flows west in the Chibougamau, then Eeyou Istchee James Bay (municipality) in the administrative region of Nord-du-Québec, Quebec, Canada.

From the source, the course of the river successively crosses the townships of: Roy, McKenzie, O'Balski, Hauy, Scott, Barlow, Mckenzie, Blainlock, McKenzie, Barlow, Cuvier, Opemisca, Lamarck, Guettard, Saussure, Ribourde, Ronciere, Ribourde, Krieghoff and Gand.

The surface of the Iserhoff North River is usually frozen from early November to mid-May, however, safe ice circulation is usually from mid-November to mid-April.

Geography 
The surrounding hydrographic slopes of the Chibougamau River are:
North side: Maicasagi River, Caupichigau River, Comencho Lake and Opataca Lake;
East side: Chibougamau Lake, Obatogamau Lakes;
South side: Opawica River and Obatogamau River;
West side: Waswanipi River, Lake Waswanipi, Goéland Lake (Waswanipi River).

The head of the Chibougamau River hydrographic slope is located South of the Mistassini Lake.

The Chibougamau Lake is the main source of the Chibougamau River, which flows more than 200 km to the west in complex zigzags. The mouth of Chibougamau Lake flows westward into Lac aux Dorés, located southeast of the town of Chibougamau. The mouth of "Lac aux Dorés" is located at the bottom of a bay south of the lake in Obalski Township.

Flowing south, the Chibougamau River flares out to form Merrill Lake, then the river waters Scott Township to the north. On its irregular course, the river crosses successively 12 lakes: Ledden, David, Dulieux, Simon, Scott, Acinitchibastat, Gwillim, Chevrillon, Rush, Barlow, Opémisca and Michwacho.

At its mouth, the Chibougamau River converges with the Opawica River (coming from the southeast) to form the Waswanipi River. This point of convergence is just upstream of the Waswanipi River bridge on road 113 connecting Chapais with Lebel-sur-Quévillon. The village of Waswanipi is located near the mouth of the two rivers on the north bank of the Chibougamau River.

On its route, the river drains in particular the area of establishment Cri de Oujé-Bougoumou, located on the north shore of Lake Opémisca. This hamlet is 16.3 km (in a direct line) North of the village of Chapais. The summit of Mount Opémisca is located  North of Opémisca Lake and  Northwest of Cri de Oujé-Bougoumou.

After crossing Michwacho, the Chibougamau River branches North and West to bypass the Michwacho Mountains, Roy, "of the Solitary Sentinel"() and the Pachyderm Hills.

Toponymy
In 1816 James Clouston of the Hudson's Bay Company drew a map of the area, which refers to the name "Capacomou River" to refer to the Chibougamau River.

The toponym Chibougamau River was formalized on December 5, 1968, at the Bank of place names of the Commission de toponymie du Quebec, when it was created.

Notes and references

See also 

Rivers of Nord-du-Québec
Nottaway River drainage basin
Eeyou Istchee James Bay